Caleta de Velez is a village in the Spanish province of Málaga, Andalusia. It belongs to Vélez-Málaga and it is in Axarquía. It is 35 kilometers away from Málaga. Its population is about 3659 people. It has 4.2 km² of area.

Geography
It is on the shores of the Mediterranean Sea, between Torre del Mar and Algarrobo-Costa and has a beach.

Transport

Roads
The Autovía A-7, (Autovia del Mediterraneo) passes to the north and the N340 crosses Caleta closer to the coast.

Bus
This two routes of ALSA stop in Caleta de Velez:
Line Málaga - Nerja
Line Málaga - Torrox
There is also a line of local bus Caleta - Almayate.

Boats
Caleta de Velez has a sea port.caleta

Culture

Gastronomy
Its gastronomy is based on Mediterranean food, such as fish soups, "pescaito" or avocado.

References

Populated places in the Province of Málaga